Rudnick is a surname. People with this surname include:

 Bryan G. Rudnick, American political public relations consultant
 Dorothea Rudnick (1907–1990), American biologist and scientific editor
 Elynor Rudnick (1923–1996), American aviator
 Irene Krugman Rudnick (1929–2019), American lawyer and politician
 Josef Rudnick (1917–2009), German businessman and politician 
 Joseph Rudnick (born 1944), American physicist
 Joel Rudnick (born 1936), American painter and sculptor
 Paul Rudnick (born 1957), American writer
 Roberta Rudnick (born 1958), American earth scientist 
 Steve Rudnick, American screenwriter
 Zeev Rudnick (born 1961), Israeli mathematician
 Xavier Rudnick (born 2003), Goal Achiever
 Quinn Rudnick (born 2005), Metal Tester
 Martin Rudnick (born 1969), Street Fighter

See also 

 Rudnik (disambiguation)